Glynis Carol Penny (née Goodburn; born 28 January 1951) is a retired long-distance runner from England.

Athletics career
Penny competed in the late 1970s and early 1980s. She set her personal best (2:36:21) in the women's marathon on 17 April 1983, finishing in third place at the London Marathon. She represented England marathon event, at the 1986 Commonwealth Games in Edinburgh, Scotland.

International competitions

References

ARRS
gbrathletics

External links

1951 births
Living people
British female long-distance runners
British female marathon runners
English female long-distance runners
English female marathon runners
Athletes (track and field) at the 1986 Commonwealth Games
Commonwealth Games competitors for England